A tamp is a device used to compact or flatten an aggregate or another powdered or granular material, typically to make it resistant to further compression or simply to increase its density.

Examples
 Small, handheld tampers are used to compress ground coffee into a puck to prepare espresso.  

 Manual or powered tampers compact gravel before laying a concrete or brick patio or walkway so that the underlying gravel layer does not settle over time, or compress the fill in a utility trench as seen in the illustration.  
 Self-propelled, mechanised ballast tamping machines, which compact the ballast underneath rail tracks.
 Preparing some firearms and artillery pieces for firing may involve tamping the charge, such as explosive material or a projectile, into the barrel. For example, muzzle loaders.
 A fireplace can be tamped with a poker or similar tool to compress the material being burned (wood, coal, peat etc...).  This improves the heat/burning efficiency, by reducing the volume of burning material that is exposed to airflow.  This is often confused with damping - which involves reducing the intensity of the burn by restricting the flue or by the use of any fire retarding material such as water.

See also 
 Compactor
 Sand rammer

Tools
Articles containing video clips